Boško Petrović (born 20 April 1975) is a former Serbian football player.

References

1975 births
Living people
Serbia and Montenegro footballers
FC Spartak Vladikavkaz players
Russian Premier League players
Serbia and Montenegro expatriate footballers
Expatriate footballers in Russia
FK Rad players
FK Sileks players
Expatriate footballers in North Macedonia
Serbian footballers
FK Javor Ivanjica players
Association football defenders